Mount Kristensen is a mountain,  high, standing on the west side of Nilsen Plateau  southeast of Lindstrom Peak, in the Queen Maud Mountains of Antarctica. It was named by the Advisory Committee on Antarctic Names in 1967 for H. Kristensen, an engineer on the ship Fram of Amundsen's South Pole expedition of 1910–12. This naming preserves Amundsen's commemoration of "Mount H. Kristensen," a name applied in 1911 for an unidentifiable mountain in the general area.

References

Mountains of the Ross Dependency
Amundsen Coast